Lycée Français Anna de Noailles is a French international school in Bucharest, Romania. It serves levels maternelle (preschool) through lycée (senior high school).

History
The first French school in Romania opened in 1920 and was closed in 1949. The first "Lycée français de Bucarest" opened in 1940 and closed in 1949 due to actions from the Romanian government. A new French school for children of diplomats was permitted to open in 1956. The current French school, an embassy school that was originally the École Française de Bucarest, opened in 1960. It received its current name in 1998.

Construction of the current school began in January 2012 and was completed in 2013.

Student body
, 39% of the students were Romanians.

See also
 France–Romania relations

References

External links
  Lycée Français Anna de Noailles

International schools in Bucharest
High schools in Bucharest
Bucharest
France–Romania relations